"Will We Be Lovers" is the second single from Scottish rock band Deacon Blue's fourth studio album, Whatever You Say, Say Nothing (1992). This was the first Deacon Blue single to be released with no 7-inch single format. The single's B-sides are "Sleeper" and "Paint It Red", and the 12-inch single contains various dance remixes of the song. "Will We Be Lovers" reached No. 31 on the UK Singles Chart in February 1993.

Track listings 
All songs were written by Ricky Ross except where noted.

References 

Deacon Blue songs
1993 singles
1993 songs
Columbia Records singles
Songs written by Ricky Ross (musician)